The Boathouse may refer to:

 The Boathouse, Guelph, a historic attraction in Guelph, Ontario
 The Boathouse, Twickenham, a commercial property in Twickenham, England
 Hubbard Hall (Annapolis, Maryland), a historic building in Maryland sometimes known as "The Boat House"
 The Hollywood Hills Boathouses, Los Angeles, California
 The Boathouse, a 2021 American film directed by Hannah Cheesman